The Ohio Anti-Slavery Society (1835-1845) was an abolitionist society established in Zanesville, Ohio, by American activists such as Gamaliel Bailey, Asa Mahan, John Rankin, Charles Finney and Theordore Dwight Weld.

Background

Beginning 
The Ohio Anti-Slavery Society was originally created as an auxiliary of the American Anti-Slavery Society. Its first meeting took place in Putnam, Ohio, in April of 1835, and gathered delegates from 25 counties, along with four corresponding members from other states, William T. Allen, James G. Birney, James A. Thome and Ebenezer Martin. Later, the society's headquarters moved to Cleveland, Ohio.

The Society 
The society was created with the purpose of ending slavery in the United States. The Ohio Anti-Slavery Society's constitution stated that its objective was the "abolition of slavery throughout the United States and the elevation of our colored brethren to their proper rank as men."

Along with sponsoring traveling lecturers, the Society made James G. Birney's newspaper The Philanthropist its official press.

During the Cincinnati riots of 1836, pro-slavery citizens protested against the activities of the society and destroyed Birney's printing press. A committee of citizens asked for the closure of the newspaper, but their request was declined by the Society's executive committee on the basis of " freedom of press".

In 1836 - during the Society's first anniversary -, the members voted for a new executive board that included: Gamaliel Bailey, James G. Birney, Isaac Colby, C. Donaldson, James C. Ludlow, Thomas Maylin, John Melendy, and Rees E. Price.

Several abolitionists considered the participation of African-Americans in the society unimportant and unnecessary, but John Rankin and Gamaliel Bailey "slowly accepted African American involvement," and "Rankin declared racial prejudice criminal and a violation of the 'law of love.'"

Expansion 
In 1836, the Ohio Anti-Slavery Society grew from 20 chapters to 120 chapters in every part of the state. By December of the same year, ten thousand Ohioans were part of the Society.

Division 
During the 1840 anniversary of the society, its adherents passed a resolution that forbade it from becoming a political force. A portion of its members asked to cut their ties with the American Anti-Slavery Society and to keep a neutral approach in their abolitionist work.

In June 1841, a meeting was held at Mt. Pleasant, where several members vouched for independent political action. Some of the society's officials held a separate meeting exclusive for political abolitionists who eventually supported the Liberty Party.

Due to the post-panic economy, the Society and its official publication The Philanthropist started losing their prominence, and by September 1841 the presses were ravaged in a two-day riot.

References 

American abolitionist organizations
Organizations established in 1835
1845 disestablishments